Bert Hollingdale (1889–11 February 1961) was a Welsh international rugby union forward who played club rugby for Swansea Rugby Football Club and was capped for Wales on two occasions. His younger brother Tom also played rugby, though he played for rival club Neath and had a more successful international career, representing Wales six times.

Hollingdale made his Welsh international debut on 14 December 1912 against the touring South African team. He would face the South Africans twelve days later as part of the Swansea team that achieved a tight victory over the tourists. His second and final cap was during the 1913 Five Nations Championship when he was selected to face England. The Welsh team lost badly and Hollingdale was one of eight players from the side that would not represent Wales again.

International matches played Wales
 1913
 1912

Bibliography

References 

1889 births
1961 deaths
Rugby union forwards
Rugby union players from Swansea
Swansea RFC players
Wales international rugby union players
Welsh rugby union players